As the Bell Rings is a Disney Channel short franchise, based on the original Disney Channel Italian series Quelli dell'intervallo, that has been adapted for numerous other markets worldwide:

As the Bell Rings franchise

Original version

Other versions

References

External links
  Official site
 QUelli dell'intervallo at movieplayer.it

Disney Channel original programming
Disney Media Networks franchises
Disney Channels Worldwide original programming
Television series about teenagers